Édouard Martin may refer to:
 Édouard Martin (wrestler) (1889–?), French wrestler
 Édouard Martin (playwright) (1825–1866), French playwright
 Édouard Martin (politician) (born 1963), French politician and trade unionist